Jeremy Bates and Jo Durie were the defending champions but lost in the second round to Eddie Edwards and Elna Reinach.

Sherwood Stewart and Zina Garrison defeated Kelly Jones and Gretchen Magers in the final, 6–1, 7–6(7–3) to win the mixed doubles tennis title at the 1988 Wimbledon Championships.

Seeds

  Emilio Sánchez /  Martina Navratilova (quarterfinals)
  John Fitzgerald /  Elizabeth Smylie (semifinals)
  Jim Pugh /  Jana Novotná (second round)
  Paul Annacone /  Betsy Nagelsen (third round)
  Christo van Rensburg /  Hana Mandlíková (first round)
  Danie Visser /  Rosalyn Fairbank (third round)
  Jeremy Bates /  Jo Durie (second round)
  Jim Grabb /  Elise Burgin (first round)
  Pavel Složil /  Steffi Graf (second round, withdrew)
  Rick Leach /  Patty Fendick (semifinals)
  Darren Cahill /  Nicole Provis (quarterfinals)
  Tom Nijssen /  Manon Bollegraf (first round)
  Michael Mortensen /  Tine Scheuer-Larsen (third round, withdrew)
  Sherwood Stewart /  Zina Garrison (champions)
  Robert Van't Hof /  Mary-Lou Daniels (first round)
  Marcel Freeman /  Lori McNeil (quarterfinals)

Draw

Finals

Top half

Section 1

Section 2

Bottom half

Section 3

Section 4

References

External links

1988 Wimbledon Championships – Doubles draws and results at the International Tennis Federation

X=Mixed Doubles
Wimbledon Championship by year – Mixed doubles